Strophurus krisalys is a species of gecko, a lizard in the family Diplodactylidae. The species is endemic to Australia.

Etymology
The specific name, krisalys, is in honor of Kristin Alys Sadlier.

Geographic range
S. krisalys is found in the Australian state of Queensland.

Habitat
The preferred habitats of S. krisalys are forest, savanna, and shrubland.

Behaviour
S. krisalys is arboreal.

Reproduction
S. krisalys is oviparous.

References

Further reading
Cogger HG (2014). Reptiles and Amphibians of Australia, Seventh Edition. Clayton, Victoria, Australia: CSIRO Publishing. xxx + 1,033 pp. .
; O'Meally, Denis; Shea, Glenn M. (2005). "A new species of spiny-tailed gecko (Squamata: Diplodactylidae: Strophurus) from inland Queensland". Memoirs of the Queensland Museum 51 (2): 573–582. (Strophurus krisalys, new species).
Wilson, Steve; Swan, Gerry (2013). A Complete Guide to Reptiles of Australia, Fourth Edition. Sydney: New Holland Publishers. 522 pp. .

Strophurus
Endemic fauna of Australia
Geckos of Australia
Reptiles of Queensland
Reptiles described in 2005
Taxa named by Ross Allen Sadlier
Taxa named by Denis O'Meally
Taxa named by Glenn Michael Shea